Salles-Curan is a commune in the Aveyron department in southern France.

Geography
The lac de Pareloup forms part of the commune's northern border.

The river Céor has its source in the western part of the commune.

Population

See also
Communes of the Aveyron department

References

Communes of Aveyron
Aveyron communes articles needing translation from French Wikipedia